Lekan is a Yoruba name common in Nigeria. Other variations of the name includes Olalekan, Olamilekan, Adelekan and it mostly a male first name. It means "my wealth has increased".

Notable people with the name Lekan 

 Lekan Babalola, Nigerian jazz percussionist and musician
 Lekan Balogun, Nigerian dramatist and theatre director
 Lekan Balogun (politician), Nigerian senator and Ibadan king
 Lekan Fatodu, Nigerian Journalist

Notable people with the name Olalekan 

 Afeez Aremu Olalekan, Nigerian footballer
 Bashorun Olalekan, Nigerian academic
 Olalekan Bola, Nigerian footballer
 Olalekan Jeyifous, Nigerian-born visual artist 
 Joshua Olalekan Ogunwole, Nigerian scientist
 Lateef Olalekan Kayode, Nigerian boxer
 Olalekan Olude, Nigerian Entrepreneur
 Ramoni Olalekan Mustapha, Nigerian politician
 Lekan Salami, Nigerian businessman and football administrator
 Olalekan Sipasi, Nigerian entrepreneur

Notable people with the name Olamilekan 

 Olamilekan Adegbite, Nigerian politician
 Afolabi Adedoyin Olamilekan Oluwatimileh Obafemi , English footballer
 Eniola Olamilekan Adedeji, aka DJ Enimoney, Nigerian disc jockey
 Olamilekan Massoud Al-Khalifah Agbeleshebioba, aka Laycon, Nigerian rapper, singer, songwriter, and reality TV star
 Azeez Ramon Olamilekan, Nigerian footballer
 Kareem Olamilekan, Nigerian hyperrealism artist 
 Solomon Olamilekan Adeola, Nigerian politician 
 Sodiq Olamilekan Fatai, Nigerian footballer

Lekan as a non-Nigerian name 

 Boštjan Lekan, Slovenian biathlete

References